Alidou is both a surname and a given name. Notable people with the name include:

Hassana Alidou (born 1963), Nigerien diplomat
Ousseina Alidou (born 1963), Nigerien academic, twin sister of Hassana
Alidou Badini, Burkinabé film director
Alidou Barkire (born 1925), Nigerien politician